The Justas de Atletismo y Festival Deportivo de Puerto Rico —better known as Las Justas Intercolegiales or simply as Las Justas— is an intercollegiate sports competition held annually in Puerto Rico where Puerto Rican colleges and universities compete against each other in different sports. The event is sponsored by the Liga Atlética Interuniversitaria de Puerto Rico (LAI). The event usually include competitions in softball, basketball, beach volleyball, judo, table tennis, swimming, cheerleading, women's football, and athletics.

The sporting event is supplemented by artistic presentations every evening after athletic events have come to an end. The athletics portion of the events is attended by some 20,000 spectators, while the cultural events receive upwards of 150,000 guests. 

For many years the event was held in San Juan, but in 1993 it was moved to the city of Ponce, where  - except for 2010 and 2016 – it has been held since. The week-long event takes place during the month of April.  Due to the 2020 Puerto Rico earthquakes in the Ponce area, the 2020 edition of the Justas was moved from Ponce and were scheduled to take place in Mayagüez from 23 to 25 April at the Jose Antonio Figueroa Freyle Stadium.  However, due to the COVID-19 pandemic, the  Liga Atlética Interuniversitaria (LAI) announced on 15 March 2020, that the event was being suspended and that a new future date would be sought. Given the island-wide COVID-19 curfew and lockdown ordered by the Government of Puerto Rico subsequent to the 15 March LAI suspension decision date, on 13 April 2020 the LAI announced the event could not be held and canceled it for the remainder of the 2020 season. The 2021 version of the event was also cancelled due to the pandemic. The 2022 season is scheduled for 1-7 May 2022.

History

Las Justas date back to the creation of Liga Atlética Interuniversitaria de Puerto Rico (English: Puerto Rico Intercollegiate Athletic League).  The league was founded in 1929 by Cosme Beitía of the University of Puerto Rico, Rio Piedras Campus, Charles Leker for the Instituto Politécnico de San German, and Luis Izquierdo Galo y José D. Morales from the Colegio de Agricultura y Artes Mecánicas of Mayagüez.  Las Justas began as a three-event competition between the institutions in the year 1929: baseball, basketball, and athletics.

Originally it included only male participants but starting with the 1969-1970 academic year women began competing as well. Las Justas had been moved to Ponce in 1993 as a test for the 1993 Central American and Caribbean Games.  For many years the event was held in San Juan, but in 1993 the event was moved to the city of Ponce which has all the required facilities for holding the event. In 2010 the event was held in Mayagüez in preparation for the 2010 Central American and Caribbean Games. The event resumed in Ponce in 2011, and continued in Ponce in 2012.

Venue
Sporting events take place at the sports facilities of Pontificia Universidad Católica de Puerto Rico, the athletic field at urbanización Villa del Carmen, Polideportivo at urbanización Los Caobos, Paquito Montaner Stadium, Auditorio Juan Pachín Vicéns, and the Piscina Olímpica Víctor Vassallo.  Musical events take place at Plaza Las Delicias. La Guancha is also another recreational and musical venue.

Security
With over 200,000 people attending Las Justas every year, security has been a major concern.  In 2010, for example, 13 people were arrested for drug activities during the events. Las Justas, it is said, has evolved into a Puerto Rican-style Spring Break.  Close to 1,500 security personnel patrol the event for security.  A number of items are not permitted in the areas where activities of Las Justas are celebrated, including both sporting events and associated musical celebrations. Coolers, liquids not in their original containers, glass bottles, umbrellas, baseball bats, canes, and fire arms are some of the items that are excluded.  In 2012, Enrique Arrarás Mir, the Commissioner of the event, said that “the safest place in all of Puerto Rico during the celebration of Las Justas will be the city of Ponce”. In 2011, in Mayaguez, there were also arrests for drunkness and drug trafficking. In 2014, electronic scanners were implemented at checkpoints, doing away with the former and slower manual frisk system.

Economy
In 2009, it was estimated that Las Justas generate close to $6 million USD in income resulting from food and other sales as well as lodging.  In addition to donating the use of the facilities throughout the city, the Ponce Municipal Government also contributes $200,000 to the costs of celebrating Las Justas in Ponce.

Broadcast
The events are relayed via DIRECTV (Puerto Rico Channel 161) and via Canal Universitario Ana G. Méndez “Sistema TV” on channels 40 and 26, as well as streamed via www.sistematv.com.

Sports played
 men's baseball
 men's & women's basketball
 men's & women's cross country
 men's & women's judo
 men's & women's soccer
 men's & women's softball
 men's & women's swimming
 men's & women's table tennis
 men's & women's tennis
 men's & women's volleyball
 men's water polo
 men's weightlifting
 men's wrestling
 men's & women's cheerleading (Spanish: “Porrismo”)

Participants
As of 2012, twenty-one universities participate in the event as follows:

Winners
According to Gabrielle Paese, Las Justas have become “a power struggle between just two universities: [Universidad del ] Turabo, the Caguas school in the Ana G. Mendez system, versus San German’s Inter American University. Led by two strong track coaches (Luis Dieppa of Turabo and Freddy Vargas of Inter American U., respectively) the schools compete for the overall title. That means the meet becomes more about which school accumulates the most points and less about individual performance.”

2011
The 2011 winners were as follows:

Men's competitions
 First Place: Tigres of the Universidad Interamericana de Puerto Rico, 161.50 points. 
 Second Place: Pitirres of the Universidad del Este, 144 points. 
 Third Place: Taínos of the Universidad del Turabo.

Women's competitions
 First Place: Cocodrilas of the Universidad Metropolitana, 201 points (also won 1st place during the 2010 season).

2012
The 2012 winners were as follows:

Men’s competitions
 First Place: Tigres of the Universidad Interamericana, 255 points. 
 Second Place: Pontificia Universidad Catolica de Puerto Rico, 210 points. 
 Third Place: Gallitos of the University of Puerto Rico, Río Piedras Campus, 146.50 points.
 Fourth Place: Universidad del Sagrado Corazon, 108 points.

Women’s competitions
 First Place: Taínas of the Universidad del Turabo, 274 points.
 Second Place: Gallitos of the University of Puerto Rico, Río Piedras Campus, 206 points.
 Third Place:  Pontificia Universidad Catolica de Puerto Rico, 121 points.
 Fourth Place: Universidad del Sagrado Corazon, 106 points.

2013
The 2013 winners were as follows:

Men’s competitions
 First Place: Tigres of the Universidad Interamericana de Puerto Rico, 180 points. 
 Second Place: Pitirres of the Universidad del Este, 150 points. 
 Third Place: Taínos of the Universidad del Turabo, 123 points.
 Fourth Place: Gallitos of the University of Puerto Rico, Río Piedras Campus, 117 points.
 Fifth Place:  Cocodrilos of the Universidad del Este, 83 points.

Women’s competitions
 First Place: Cocodrilas of the Universidad Metropolitana, 152 points.
 Second Place: Pitirres of the Universidad del Este, 142 points.
 Third Place:  Tigresas of the Universidad Interamericana, 137 points.
 Fourth Place: Taínas of the Universidad del Turabo, 124 points.

Specific sport results

Dance Teams

2008
 1st University of Puerto Rico, Río Piedras Campus 
 2nd University of Puerto Rico at Bayamón
 3rd University of Puerto Rico at Ponce 
 4th Universidad del Sagrado Corazon
 5th Universidad Interamericana

2009
 1st University of Puerto Rico at Bayamón
 2nd University of Puerto Rico, Río Piedras Campus 
 3rd Universidad del Sagrado Corazon
 4th University of Puerto Rico at Ponce 
 5th University of Puerto Rico at Mayagüez

2010
 1st University of Puerto Rico at Bayamón
 2nd University of Puerto Rico at Mayagüez
 3rd Universidad del Sagrado Corazon
 4th University of Puerto Rico at Carolina 
 5th University of Puerto Rico at Ponce

2011 
 1st University of Puerto Rico at Bayamón
 2nd Universidad del Sagrado Corazon
 3rd Universidad Metropolitana
 4th University of Puerto Rico at Ponce 
 5th University of Puerto Rico at Carolina

2012
 1st University of Puerto Rico at Bayamón
 2nd University of Puerto Rico, Río Piedras Campus 
 3rd University of Puerto Rico at Carolina
 4th University of Puerto Rico at Ponce 
 5th Universidad del Sagrado Corazon

2013 
 1st University of Puerto Rico at Bayamón
 2nd University of Puerto Rico, Río Piedras Campus 
 3rd Universidad Metropolitana
 4th University of Puerto Rico at Mayagüez
 5th Pontificia Universidad Católica de Puerto Rico

2014
 1st University of Puerto Rico at Bayamón
 2nd University of Puerto Rico, Río Piedras Campus 
 3rd University of Puerto Rico at Carolina
 4th Pontificia Universidad Católica de Puerto Rico
 5th University of Puerto Rico at Ponce

2020
Games not celebrated due to the Covid-19 pandemic.

2021
Games not celebrated due to the Covid-19 pandemic.

References

External links

 https://web.archive.org/web/20140604164811/http://www.ligaatleticainteruniversitariadepr.com/
 https://web.archive.org/web/20090312022744/http://www.freewebs.com/deportivas_lai/

Athletics in Puerto Rico
1929 establishments in Puerto Rico
College sports conferences in the United States
Liga Atletica Interuniversitaria de Puerto Rico
Multi-sport events in Puerto Rico
Sports events in Ponce, Puerto Rico
Recurring sporting events established in 1929
Annual events in Puerto Rico
Puerto Rico college
Sports governing bodies in North America